Syleham is a small parish, next to the River Waveney in Suffolk, England, about six miles east of Diss.

Its church, St Margaret, is one of 38 existing round-tower churches in Suffolk. The windmill was one of the casualties of the Great Storm of 1987.

References

External links

Website with photos of Syleham St Margaret
Syleham Parish Council

Villages in Suffolk
Mid Suffolk District
Civil parishes in Suffolk